"The Old Man and the Seat" is the second episode of the fourth season of the Adult Swim animated television series Rick and Morty. Written by Michael Waldron and directed by Jacob Hair, loosely adapting The Old Man and the Sea by Ernest Hemingway, the episode aired in the United States on November 17, 2019.

Plot 
An alien intern named Glootie serves breakfast to the Smiths, often asking for assistance in developing a mobile app. As Rick pats his belly and excuses himself for a solo adventure, which Summer surmises as defecating, Jerry is curious and offers to develop Glootie's app, even though Rick has tattooed "Do Not Develop My App" on Glootie's forehead. Glootie and Jerry's app goes online; named "Lovefinderrz", it is a dating app that entices its users to divert their full attention into finding their true love. Summer ditches Beth on their lunch for her date, leading to a fight between the two.

Seeing the widespread chaos, Jerry realizes his wrongdoing and joins Morty in demanding that Glootie take the app down. Glootie brings them to his mothership, where they meet the aliens' leader, who rebukes humanity's inefficiency in matchmaking and states that the app is a distraction to steal Earth's water resources. Beth chases after Summer, who constantly changes her soul mate with the app, while Jerry and Morty are captured. Jerry manages to convince Glootie to take the app offline, showing their similarity in being unable to find a match. As Morty chastises Jerry about his decisions, Glootie puts an ad wall on Lovefinderrz, leading Summer and everyone else to delete the app and resume their lives.

Rick travels to a scenic, private lavatory. Discovering that it has been intruded upon, he tracks down the culprit, who is named Tony. Despite admonishment from Rick, Tony continues to use the lavatory, leading Rick to give him a chemical called "Globaflyn" that puts him in his ideal reality — a toilet-filled heaven — before evicting him. As Rick gives him a final warning, Tony chides him about his control issues and advises friendship. Rick prepares a defense measure on the toilet designed to humiliate its future user. Upon Rick visiting Tony's office, attempting to bring him laxatives and chili, Rick learns that Tony has quit his job and died in a ski accident, having intended to live life to the fullest. Feeling guilty, Rick attends Tony's funeral and gives gifts to his father. Rick then returns to the lavatory and sits on the toilet, which spawns a crowd of holographic Ricks who mock "Tony" and his loneliness.

In the post-credits scene, Jerry consumes some Globaflyn and sees his own ideal reality: himself as a competent, well-appreciated water-bottle delivery driver.

Production and writing 
"The Old Man and the Seat" was written by Michael Waldron and directed by Jacob Hair. The episode features guest actors Sam Neill as the Monogatron leader, Kathleen Turner as his wife, Jeffrey Wright as Tony; and director Taika Waititi as Glootie. Sherri Shepherd, who voiced the Judge in the previous episode, returned to the series as the voice of Tony's wife. A preview of the episode was released on July 19, 2019.

Themes 
Vulture Liz Shannon Miller noted that the episode mainly explores the themes of loneliness and isolation. Heavy attributes the title to be a reference to Ernest Hemingway's The Old Man and the Sea, in which an old man, waning in his abilities, struggles to catch a giant marlin.

The episode also introduces the chemical "Globafin", which taps into a person's brain and creates a Matrix-like simulation of that person's ideal heaven. In an analysis by IGNs Jesse Schedeen, he wrote that Jerry's desired heaven adequately presents him as a character who constantly battles his own feelings of inadequacy and laments his chronic unemployment.

Reception

Broadcast and ratings 
The episode was broadcast by Adult Swim on November 17, 2019. According to Nielsen Media Research, "The Old Man and the Seat" was seen by 1.66 million household viewers in the United States and received a 0.97 rating among the 18–49 adult demographic, making it the lowest rated episode of the series (excluding the unannounced season 3 premiere) since season 1's "Something Ricked This Way Comes".

Critical response 
The A.V. Clubs Zack Handlen gave the episode a "B+" rating, writing that "while the end result is pretty funny and thematically coherent", he also felt it as just "slightly under-done". Entertainment Weekly gave the episode an "A" rating. Steve Greene of IndieWire gave it a "B−" rating, and described it as "the equivalent of a mild inconvenience", remarking that "reinforcing some old ideas, Rick's quest for ultimate privacy and a globe-enslaving dating app are a flimsy foundation for a repetitive episode." Vulture's Liz Shannon Miller gave it a three-out-of-five star rating, and wrote that "From the simplest of setups comes, once again, a Rick and Morty adventure that simultaneously goes completely haywire even while it exposes the innermost pathos of its characters." Reviewing for Den of Geek, Joe Matar praised the extraordinary parings of Beth and Summer, Jerry and Morty, and Rick alone with himself as going "mostly extremely well." Ray Flook of Bleeding Cool described its concept as combining of the emotional gut-punch of the ending to the second season episode "Auto Erotic Assimilation" with the chainsaw-slicing social satire found in "Rick Potion No. 9" and any of the "Interdimensional Cable" segments.

References

External links 

2019 American television episodes
Rick and Morty episodes
Television episodes written by Michael Waldron